Lichtenberg is a district of Berlin.

Lichtenberg may also refer to:

Places
 Lichtenberg, Austria, a municipality in Upper Austria, Austria
 Lichtenberg, Bas-Rhin, a commune in Alsace, France
 Lichtenberg, Bavaria, a town in northeastern Bavaria, Germany
 Lichtenberg, Mittelsachsen, a municipality in Saxony, Germany
 Lichtenberg, Bautzen, a municipality in Saxony, Germany
 Lichtenberg (locality), a locality of Berlin in Lichtenberg district
 Berlin-Lichtenberg station, a railway station in Lichtenberg district
 Principality of Lichtenberg, a former state in the Palatinate

Castles, burgs, and châteaux

France
 Château de Lichtenberg near Lichtenberg, Bas-Rhin, Alsace

Germany
 Burg Lichtenberg (Palatinate) near Kusel in Rhineland-Palatinate
 Burg Lichtenberg (Oberstenfeld) near Oberstenfeld, Baden-Württemberg
 Salzgitter-Lichtenberg, near Salzgitter, Lower Saxony
 Schloss Lichtenberg (Hessen), in Hesse

Netherlands
 Castle Lichtenberg at Mount Saint Peter in Maastricht

Astronomy
 7970 Lichtenberg, an asteroid
 Lichtenberg (crater), a lunar crater
 Humason (crater) or Lichtenberg G, a lunar crater

Other uses
 Lichtenberg figure

Persons with the surname
 Pletl Von Litchenberg (born 1645), Arch Bishop Bruno  
 Bernhard Lichtenberg (1875–1943), German Catholic priest and theologian
 Byron K. Lichtenberg (born 1948), American astronaut
 Conrad of Lichtenberg (1240–1299), German bishop
 Cornel Lichtenberg (1848 – after 1895), Hungarian aurist
 Dave Lichtenberg, American musician performing under the name Little Fyodor
 Georg Christoph Lichtenberg (1742–1799), German scientist, satirist and anglophile
 Jacqueline Lichtenberg (born 1942), American science fiction author
 Leopold Lichtenberg (1861–1935), American violinist
 Lenka Lichtenberg, Canadian singer and songwriter
 Philip Lichtenberg (1669–1678), Dutch military officer and governor of Surinam
 Steen Lichtenberg (born 1930s), Danish engineer and Emeritus Professor 
 Tom Lichtenberg (1940–2013), American college football coach

See also 
Lichtenburg (disambiguation)
Lichtenberger